Charles Townsend was a Republican politician in the Ohio House of Representatives, Ohio Senate, and was Ohio Secretary of State from 1881 to 1883.

Biography
Charles Townsend was born December 22, 1834 in Harrisville, Belmont County, Ohio, to Samuel H. Townsend and Rebecca Morrison, and removed to Athens County in childhood. He attended common schools, and taught school for expenses as he attended Ohio University, where he graduated in 1861. He founded Decamp Institute in Meigs County, Ohio, and was in charge of that school when the American Civil War began. In July, 1861, he enlisted in the Union Army, and in August was made a Captain in the Thirtieth Ohio Volunteer Infantry. On January 27, 1864, he was made Major of the regiment. After the War he graduated from Cincinnati Law School in 1866. Townsend was elected Prosecuting Attorney of Athens County, Ohio three times.

In 1877 he was elected to the Ohio House of Representatives for the 64th General Assembly, and re-elected in 1879 for the 65th. He resigned when he was elected Ohio Secretary of State in 1880, and ran again in 1882, but was defeated. He served as State Commander of the Grand Army of the Republic, and was elected to the Ohio Senate in 1887 for the 9th District in the 68th General Assembly.

Townsend married Margaret Jane Allen in October 1859, and had three children, Helen, Charles and Mary. He was a Mason.

Notes

References

Secretaries of State of Ohio
People from Belmont County, Ohio
People from Athens County, Ohio
Ohio lawyers
1834 births
Republican Party members of the Ohio House of Representatives
Republican Party Ohio state senators
Union Army officers
People of Ohio in the American Civil War
County district attorneys in Ohio
University of Cincinnati College of Law alumni
Ohio University alumni
1900 deaths
19th-century American politicians
19th-century American lawyers
Grand Army of the Republic officials